Puerto Morelos is one of the eleven municipalities of the Mexican state of Quintana Roo, on the Yucatán Peninsula. It was formed in 2016 from the localities of Puerto Morelos, Leona Vicario and Central Vallarta previously belonging to the municipality of Benito Juárez. In the 2010 census, these three localities recorded a total of 15,725 inhabitants.

Joaquín Zetina Gasca is one of the communities in the municipality and the location of the municipal offices.

Municipal presidents

Leonel Medina Mendoza, 2016-2019
Laura Fernández Piña, 2019-2021
Ana Luisa Betancourt Canul (Interim), starting March 8, 2021

References

External links
 

Municipalities of Quintana Roo